Before We Forgot How to Dream is the debut album by Northern Irish singer/songwriter Soak. The album was released on 29 May 2015 under Rough Trade Records. It was nominated for the 2015 Mercury Music Prize.

It subsequently won the Choice Music Prize on Thursday 3 March 2016.

Artwork
The artwork for the album was provided by Irish artist Jack Coulter. The CD booklet and vinyl sleeve consists of three of Coulter's photographs and two of his original paintings.

The front cover is a photograph of SOAK taken by Joshua Halling.

Track listing

Charts

References

2015 debut albums
Rough Trade Records albums
SOAK albums
European Border Breakers Award-winning albums